Wąsosze is a lake located in Gmina Złocieniec, West Pomeranian Voivodeship, Poland.

References

Lakes of Poland
Lakes of West Pomeranian Voivodeship